United Junior Senior High School is a small, rural public secondary school located in East Wheatfield Township, Pennsylvania, United States. The school serves the borough of Armagh and the townships of Brush Valley, Buffington, East Wheatfield, and West Wheatfield. It is the sole junior senior high school operated by the United School District. The building is located on the same campus as the sole elementary school in the district. The United Cyber Academy is for district students K-12. High school students may choose to attend Indiana County Technology Center for training in the construction and mechanical trades as well as other careers. The ARIntermediate Unit IU28 provides the district with a wide variety of services like specialized education for disabled students and hearing, background checks for employees, state mandated recognizing and reporting child abuse training, speech and visual disability services and professional development for staff and faculty.

In 2014, United Junior Senior High School enrollment was reported as 524 pupils in 7th through 12th grades. The school employed 47 teachers.

Extracurriculars
The United School District offers a wide variety of clubs, activities and an extensive, publicly funded sports program.

Clubs
There are several Clubs available to the student at United:

 Art
 Bible
 Environmental
 Future Business Leaders of America (FBLA)
 Junior High Environmental
 Library
 Middle School Student Council
 National Honor Society
Yearbook
 Robotics
 Science
 Senior High Student Council
 Tri-M Music Honor Society
 United Quiz Bowl

Athletics
The school provides:
Varsity

Boys
Baseball - A
Basketball- AA
Cross Country - A
Football - A
Golf - AA
Soccer - A
Track and Field - AA
Wrestling	- AA

Girls
Basketball - AA
Cheerleading - AAAA
Cross Country - A
Golf - A
Soccer (Fall) - A
Softball - AA
Track and Field - AA
Volleyball - A

Junior High School Sports

Boys
Basketball
Football
Track and Field
Wrestling	

Girls
Basketball
Cheerleading
Track and Field
Volleyball

According to PIAA directory July 2015

References

Public high schools in Pennsylvania
Public middle schools in Pennsylvania
Schools in Indiana County, Pennsylvania